Helmut Jahn (22 October 1917 – 18 March 1986) was a German footballer who played as a goalkeeper He made 17 appearances for the Germany national team between 1939 and 1942.

References

1917 births
1986 deaths
German footballers
Association football goalkeepers
Germany international footballers
FC St. Pauli players
VfB Stuttgart players
Stuttgarter Kickers players
Footballers from Nuremberg